Qaracalar (also, Karalar, Karaliar and Karadzhalar) is a village and municipality in the Saatly Rayon of Azerbaijan.  It has a population of 976.

References 

Populated places in Saatly District